Joanna Lee (April 7, 1931 – October 24, 2003) was an American writer, producer, director and actress.

Early life
Lee was born in Newark, New Jersey.

Career
As an actress, Lee's career was only in small roles, 10 in all, including seven TV series and three feature films, all between 1956 and 1961. The latter included an uncredited appearance in a lesser-known Frank Sinatra film, The Joker Is Wild (1957), plus two low-budget science fiction films. Those two were The Brain Eaters (1958) and a film that in later years would come to be regarded as the quintessential 'so-bad-it's-good' cult classic, Plan 9 from Outer Space (1959), in which Lee portrays "Tanna" the space girl.

A serious car accident in 1961 necessitated a career change. By 1962 Lee had landed writing assignments for My Three Sons and The Flintstones. Lee wrote more than 20 episodes of The Flintstones, and is widely credited with creating The Great Gazoo. She wrote an episode of Gilligan's Island (1964–67), entitled "Beauty Is as Beauty Does", which aired on September 23, 1965. Lee also wrote two episodes for the final season of the series, each of which based the plot line on one of the castaways meeting their double. Also in this period (September 1962) she appeared as a contestant on the popular CBS television program What's My Line, describing her work at that point as being a TV comedy writer. In her June 11, 1959 appearance on You Bet Your Life, Joanna Lee describes her career and also wins $3,000 in prize money.

Her writing career stretched from 1962 until 1990, including many dozens of comedic and dramatic television series episodes before writing, producing, and directing various TV movies and "Afterschool Specials." In 1971 she wrote two scripts for the television show, Room 222.

In 1973, she won an Emmy Award for Best Writing in Drama, for a 1972 Thanksgiving episode of The Waltons. The same year, she formed her own production company, which, in 1975, produced the documentary Babe (also written by Lee), about athlete Babe Zaharias's career. The film was nominated for an Emmy for "Outstanding Writing in a Special Program - Drama or Comedy - Original Teleplay," and won the Golden Globe for "Best Motion Picture Made for Television."

She wrote the novel and teleplay Mary Jane Harper Cried Last Night.

In 1988, she won the Humanitas Prize for The Kid Who Wouldn't Quit: The Brad Silverman Story.

Personal life
Her son, Craig Lee, then a music director at L. A. Weekly, died of AIDS in 1992. Another son, Christopher Ciampa, appeared in several of her films.

Her autobiography, A Difficult Woman in Hollywood, was published in 1999.

Lee died from bone cancer on October 24, 2003, in Santa Monica, at the age of 72.

References

External links 
Appearance On What's My Line 9/9/62 at 10:10 on show

 The Joanna Lee scripts at the American Heritage Center

1931 births
2003 deaths
American television writers
American television producers
American women television producers
Primetime Emmy Award winners
Writers from Newark, New Jersey
Deaths from bone cancer
Deaths from cancer in California
20th-century American actresses
Burials at Westwood Village Memorial Park Cemetery
Actresses from Newark, New Jersey
Screenwriters from New Jersey
American women television writers
20th-century American screenwriters
21st-century American women